Truls Vasvik (born 28 June 1978) is a Norwegian politician.

He was elected representative to the Storting from the constituency of Vestfold for the period 2021–2025, for the Labour Party. He was deputy representative to the Storting 2017–2021.

References

1978 births
Living people
Labour Party (Norway) politicians
Vestfold politicians
Members of the Storting